Anker, also spelled Ancher, is a Danish and Norwegian noble family living in Norway. The name means anchor. Originally from Sweden, the family became a part of the Patriciate of Norway in the 18th century, and members of the family were ennobled in 1778.

Name and origin
The family came to Norway's capital Oslo with Erich Olufsen Ancher (1644–1699), who was a representative for merchant Peter Bahrum in Lübeck. His parents were trader Oluf Eriksson († 1682) and Kirsten in Gothenburg in Sweden. In Christiania, which was Oslo's name in those days, Erich Ancher became a wealthy trader, and through his marriage with Maren Lauritzdatter, he entered the city's class of rich merchants.

Among their sons, priest Bernt Erichsen Ancher (1680–1724) got the sons Erich Berntsen Ancher (1709–1785) and Christian Berntsen Ancher (1711–1765). Due to big trade, purchase of estates, and wealthy spouses, the family became a prominent family within the trading patriciate in Eastern Norway.

Members of the two principal branches above were on 14 January 1778 ennobled under the name Anker. They claimed to descend from the Swedish noble family Anckar, but this is not proven. The family name likely derived from their progenitor Oluf Eriksson in Gothenburg, who was an anchor smith.

Estates
Most of the family members' businesses and properties left their possession during the 1800s. This included the magnificent Paléet townhouse in Oslo which was bequeathed to the Norwegian royal family in 1805. The Anker Entailed Estate (Norwegian: Det ankerske Fideikomiss) in Oslo went bankrupt in 1819, and the estate complex related to Bogstad Main Farm and Nordmarka was through women inherited by the families Wedel-Jarlsberg, Løvenskiold, and Egeberg. Bogstad Main Farm and Rød Main Farm were transformed into self-owning foundations in the latest part of the 1900s.

Coat of arms
Description: On a red shield with a narrow golden edge, a black anchor with a golden anchor stick, and through a black anchor ring three crossed black arrows. On the helm a noble coronet, and above this a six-pointed star between buffalo horns divided in red, gold, and black and in black, gold, and red, respectively. Supporters: On the dexter side a bear, and on the sinister side a wolf. Both have natural colours, and their heads are directed away from the shield.

Before the ennoblement, some family members used arms displaying an anchor under two stars, and above the helm the allegorical character Spes between two hart horns.

The noble arms were brought closer to the then-extinct Swedish noble family Anckar's arms.

Motto
Latin: Gloria ex utile.

See also
 Danish nobility
 Norwegian nobility

Literature
 Danmarks Adels Aarbog (1952).
 Cappelen, Hans (1969): Norske slektsvåpen
 Finne-Grønn, S.H. (1926): Om slegten Ankers herkomst. Oplysninger om familier i Oslo og det gamle Christiania, in Norsk Personalhistorisk Tidsskrift, III, pagina 218–221
 Holck, Per (2006): Bernt Anker – Samtid, liv og forfatterskap
 Høgdahl, Hugo (1946): Norske ex libris og andre bokeiermerker
 Løvenskiold, Herman Leopoldus (1978): Heraldisk nøkkel
 Nissen, Harald, and Aase, Monica (1990): Segl i Universitetsbiblioteket i Trondheim
 Steffens, Haagen Krog (1889): Stamtavle over Familien Anker
 Steffens, Haagen Krog (1911): Norske Slægter 1912

Danish noble families
Norwegian noble families
Patriciate of Norway